Iranians in Spain have a history going back for over a millennium and form a minor population in modern day. They are a part of the Iranian diaspora.

Migration history
Razi wrote in the 10th century that some Iranians had already settled in Al-Andalus, and Ibn Battuta later claimed the Iranians of Al-Andalus preferred to live in Granada because of its similarity to their homeland. However, the impetus for modern Iranian immigration to Spain came largely from the 1979 Iranian Revolution, as a result of which some Iranians went to Spain as political refugees.

Demography
A 1992 survey found that 31.7% worked in administrative jobs, 18.2% were professionals or technicians, 25.7% worked in trade, and another 11% worked in agriculture. The vast majority were 25-54 years of age, and only one-fifth were women. This is actually a relatively large proportion of women compared to other Muslim migrant communities in Spain, which may be attributed to the fact that most Iranians in Spain are political, rather than economic migrants.

Notable people
Don Juan of Persia, 17th century notable
Abdol-Aziz Mirza Farmanfarmaian
Cihangir Ghaffari, actor and producer

See also 
Iran–Spain relations
Iranian diaspora

References

Sources
Shojaeddin Shafa, De Persia a la España musulmana : la historia recuperada, Université de Huelva (Espagne), 2000, traduction en espagnol du manuscrit en français, inédit, par Maria Angeles Gallego Garcia.

 
Islam in Spain
Ethnic groups in Spain
Muslim communities in Europe
Asian diaspora in Spain
Spain